Esoteric Nazism, also known as Esoteric Fascism or Esoteric Hitlerism, refers to a range of mystical interpretations and adaptations of Nazism. After the Second World War, esoteric interpretations of the Third Reich were adapted into new religious movements of white nationalism and neo-Nazism. They included beliefs in finding a mythical Hyperborea.

Notable adherents

Savitri Devi

French-born Greek-English writer Savitri Devi was the first major post-war exponent of what has since become known as Esoteric Hitlerism. According to that ideology, subsequent to the fall of the Third Reich and Hitler's suicide at the end of the war, Hitler himself could be deified. Devi connected Hitler's Aryanist ideology to that of the pan-Hindu part of the Indian independence movement, and activists such as Subhas Chandra Bose. For her, the swastika was an especially important symbol, as she felt it symbolized Aryan unity of Hindus and Germans.

Savitri Devi, above all, was interested in the Indian caste system, which she regarded as the archetype of racial laws intended to govern the segregation of different races and to maintain the pure blood of the fair-complexioned Aryans. She regarded the survival of the minority of Brahmins among an enormous population of many different Indian races after sixty centuries as a living tribute to the value of the Aryan caste system.

Savitri Devi integrated Nazism into a broader cyclical framework of Hindu history.  She considered Hitler to be the ninth Avatar of Vishnu, and called him "the god-like Individual of our times; the Man against Time; the greatest European of all times", having an ideal vision of returning his Aryan people to an earlier, more perfect time, and also having the practical wherewithal to fight the destructive forces "in Time". She saw his defeat—and the forestalling of his vision from coming to fruition—as a result of him being "too magnanimous, too trusting, too good", of not being merciless enough, of having in his "psychological make-up, too much 'sun' [beneficence] and not enough 'lightning.' [practical ruthlessness]", unlike his coming incarnation:

"Kalki" will act with unprecedented ruthlessness. Contrarily to Adolf Hitler, He will spare not a single one of the enemies of the divine Cause: not a single one of its outspoken opponents but also not a single one of the lukewarm, of the opportunists, of the ideologically heretical, of the racially bastardised, of the unhealthy, of the hesitating, of the all-too-human; not a single one of those who, in body or in character or mind, bear the stamp of the fallen Ages.

Robert Charroux

Unlike most ancient astronaut writers, Robert Charroux took a large interest in racialism. According to Charroux, Hyperborea was situated between Iceland and Greenland and was the home of a Nordic white race with blonde hair and blue eyes. Charroux claimed that this race was extraterrestrial in origin and had originally come from a cold planet situated far from the sun. Charroux also claimed that the white race of the Hyperboreans and their descendants, the Celts, had dominated the whole world in the ancient past. Some of these claims of Charroux have influenced the beliefs of Esoteric Nazism such as the work of Miguel Serrano.

Miguel Serrano

Miguel Serrano, a former Chilean diplomat, is a major figure in Esoteric Nazism. Author of numerous books including The Golden Ribbon: Esoteric Hitlerism (1978) and Adolf Hitler, the Last Avatar (1984), Serrano is one of a number of Nazi esotericists who regard the "Aryan blood" as originally extraterrestrial:

Serrano finds mythological evidence for the extraterrestrial origins of man in the Nephilim [fallen angels] of the Book of Genesis... Serrano suggests that the sudden appearance of Cro-Magnon Man with his high artistic and cultural achievements in prehistoric Europe records the passage of one such divya-descended race alongside the abysmal inferiority of Neanderthal Man, an abomination and manifest creation of the demiurge... Of all the races on earth, the Aryans alone preserve the memory of their divine ancestors in their noble blood, which is still mingled with the light of the Black Sun. All other races are the progeny of the demiurge's beast-men, native to the planet.

Serrano supports this idea from various myths which assign divine ancestry to 'Aryan' peoples, and even the Aztec myth of Quetzalcoatl descending from Venus. He also cites the hypothesis of Bal Gangadhar Tilak on the Arctic homeland of the Indo-Aryans, as his authority for identifying the earthly centre of the Aryan migrations with the 'lost' Arctic continent of Hyperborea. Thus, Serrano's extraterrestrial gods are also identified as Hyperboreans.

In attempting to raise the spiritual development of the earthbound races, the Hyperborean  (a Sanskrit term for god-men) suffered a tragic setback. Expanding on a story from the Book of Enoch, Serrano laments that a renegade group among the gods committed miscegenation with the terrestrial races, thus diluting the light-bearing blood of their benefactors and diminishing the level of divine awareness on the planet.

The concept of Hyperborea has a simultaneously racial and mystical meaning for Serrano. He believes that Hitler was in Shambhala, an underground centre in Antarctica (formerly at the North Pole and Tibet), where he was in contact with the Hyperborean gods and whence he would someday emerge with a fleet of UFOs to lead the forces of light (the Hyperboreans, sometimes associated with Vril) over the forces of darkness (inevitably including, for Serrano, those of the Abrahamic religions who worship the Abrahamic god) in a last battle and thus inaugurating a Fourth Reich.

Serrano follows the Gnostic tradition of the Cathars (fl. 1025–1244) by identifying the evil demiurge as Jehovah, the God of the Old Testament. As medieval dualists, these eleventh-century heretics had repudiated Jehovah as a false god and mere artificer opposed to the real God far beyond our earthly realm. This Gnostic doctrine clearly carried dangerous implications for the Jews. As Jehovah was the tribal deity of the Jews, it followed that they were devil worshipers. By casting the Jews in the role of the children of Satan, the Cathar heresy can elevate anti-Semitism to the status of a theological doctrine backed by a vast cosmology. If the Hyperborean Aryans are the archetype and blood descendents of Serrano's divyas from the Black Sun, then the archetype of the Lord of Darkness needed a counter-race. The demiurge sought and found the most fitting agent for its archetype in the Jews.

As religious scholars Frederick C. Grant and Hyam Maccoby emphasize, in the view of the dualist Gnostics, "Jews were regarded as the special people of the Demiurge and as having the special historical role of obstructing the redemptive work of the High God's emissaries". Serrano thus considered Hitler as one of the greatest emissaries of this High God, rejected and crucified by the tyranny of the Judaicized rabble like previous revolutionary light-bringers. Serrano had a special place in his ideology for the SS, who, in their quest to recreate the ancient race of Aryan god-men, he thought were above morality and therefore justified, after the example of the anti-humanitarian "detached violence" taught in the Aryo-Hindu tradition.

David Myatt

In the 1980s and 1990s, David Myatt developed an interpretation—or revisionist version—of Nazism which, although based on Savitri Devi's three principles of "above", "against", and "in time" individuals, did not involve either ancient mythology or extraterrestrial beings.

Instead, Myatt, described as "most commonly associated with the occult wing of the National Socialist movement, focused—in pamphlets such as The Meaning of National Socialism, The Enlightenment of National Socialism and his The Religion of National Socialism—on what he described as "the numinous" aspects of Nazism, with Jeffrey Kaplan writing that Myatt described Nazism as "unambiguously a religion while Adolf Hitler is treated unashamedly as the saviour of mankind."

Collective Aryan unconscious
In the book Black Sun, Nicholas Goodrick-Clarke reports how Carl Gustav Jung described "Hitler as possessed by the archetype of the collective Aryan unconscious and could not help obeying the commands of an inner voice". In a series of interviews between 1936 and 1939, Jung characterized Hitler as an archetype, often manifesting itself to the complete exclusion of his own personality. Hitler is a spiritual vessel, a demi-divinity; even better, a myth. Benito Mussolini is a man' ... the messiah of Germany who teaches the virtue of the sword. 'The voice he hears is that of the collective unconscious of his race.

Jung's suggestion that Hitler personified the collective Aryan unconscious deeply interested and influenced Miguel Serrano, who later concluded that Jung was merely psychologizing the ancient, sacred mystery of archetypal possession by the gods, independent metaphysical powers that rule over their respective races and occasionally possess their members.

Common beliefs
Since 1945, neo-Nazi writers have also proposed Shambhala and the star Aldebaran as the original homeland of the Aryans. The book Arktos: The Polar Myth in Science, Symbolism, and Nazi Survival, by Hypnerotomachia Poliphili scholar Joscelyn Godwin, discusses pseudoscientific theories about surviving Nazi elements in Antarctica. Arktos is noted for its scholarly approach and examination of many sources currently unavailable elsewhere in English-language translations. Godwin and other authors such as Nicholas Goodrick-Clarke have discussed the connections between Esoteric Nazism and Vril energy, the hidden Shambhala and Agartha civilizations, and underground UFO bases, as well as Hitler's and the SS's supposed survival in underground Antarctic bases in New Swabia, or in alliance with Hyperboreans from the subterranean world.

Relationship to neopaganism

Organisations such as the Armanen-Orden represent significant developments of neo-pagan esotericism and Ariosophy after World War II, but they do not all constitute forms of Nazi esotericism. Some northern European neopagan groups, such as Theods, Ásatrúarfélagið and Viðartrúar, have explicitly stated that neo-Nazism is not common among their members. On the other hand, there are neopagan organisations with close ties to neo-Nazism, such as the Artgemeinschaft or the Heathen Front, and the attraction of many neo-Nazis to Germanic paganism remains an issue particularly in Germany (see Nornirs Ætt).

Music
There is a contemporary loose network of small musical groups that combine neo-fascism and satanism. These groups can be found in Britain, France, and New Zealand, under names such as "Black Order" or "Infernal Alliance", and draw their inspiration from the Esoteric Hitlerism of Miguel Serrano. These groups advocate the anti-modern neo-tribalism and "Traditionalism" found in the "pagan" mysticist ideals of Alain de Benoist's Nouvelle Droite inspired by Julius Evola.

Esoteric themes, including references to artifacts such as the Holy Lance, are also often alluded to in neo-Nazi music (e.g. Rock Against Communism) and above all in National Socialist black metal.

See also

 Atomwaffen Division
 Kerry Bolton
 Cosmotheism
 Julius Evola
 The Foundations of the Nineteenth Century
 German Christians (movement)
 Landig Group
 James Mason (neo-Nazi)
 Joy of Satan Ministries
 Nazi UFOs
 Nazis: The Occult Conspiracy
 Nazism and occultism
 Positive Christianity
 QAnon
 Race of Jesus
 Religion in Nazi Germany
 Religious views of Adolf Hitler
 Religious aspects of Nazism
 Order-State of Burgundy
 Thule Society
 Fascist mysticism

References
Notes

Bibliography
 Dohe, Carrie B. (2016) Jung's Wandering Archetype: Race and Religion in Analytical Psychology. London: Routledge. 
 Glinka, Lukasz Andrzej (2014) Aryan Unconscious: Archetype of Discrimination, History & Politics. Great Abington: Cambridge International Science Publishing. 
Godwin, Joscelyn (1996) Arktos: The Polar Myth in Science, Symbolism, and Nazi Survival. Kempton, Illinois: Adventures Unlimited Press. 
Goodrick-Clark, Nicholas (1998) Hitler's Priestess: Savitri Devi, the Hindu-Aryan Myth and Neo-Nazism. New York: New York University Press. 
Goodrick-Clark, Nicholas (2002) Black Sun: Aryan Cults, Esoteric Nazism and the Politics of Identity. New York: New York University Press. . (Paperback, 2003. )
Guerra, Nicola (2014) I volontari italiani nelle Waffen-SS. Pensiero politico, formazione culturale e motivazioni al volontariato Chieti: Solfanelli. pp. 140–148.ISBN 9-788874-978588. 
Strube, Julian Strube (2012) Die Erfindung des esoterischen Nationalsozialismus im Zeichen der Schwarzen Sonne. In: Zeitschrift für Religionswissenschaft. vol. 20/2 , pp. 223–268, .

Occultism in Nazism
Conspiracy theories involving Jews

de:Rechte Esoterik
es:Ocultismo nazi
it:Misticismo nazista
pt:Misticismo nazi